Allan Giffard (born 2 October 1963) is a former Australian rules footballer who played with the Brisbane Bears in the Victorian Football League (VFL).

Giffard was a member of Brisbane's squad for their inaugural season in 1987.

A local recruit from Sherwood, Giffard played just once for the Bears. That game was against Footscray at Western Oval in round nine and he had six disposals. Prior to joining the Bears, he played over 100 senior games with the Sherwood Magpies, where he won two best and fairest awards and kicked over 100 goals in two consecutive seasons. He was runner up in the QAFL best and Fairest award in 1984 and also played 12 representative games for Queensland. After being delisted by the Bears he played with the South Launceston Bulldogs in the Tasmanian Football League.

References

1963 births
Australian rules footballers from Queensland
Brisbane Bears players
Western Magpies Australian Football Club players
South Launceston Football Club players
Living people